The following is a 'list of the heirs to the throne of the Kingdom of France, that is, those who were legally next in line to assume the throne upon the death of the King.

From 987 to 1792, all heirs to the French throne were male-line descendants of Hugh Capet.

Capetian associate kings 
The crown of France under the earliest Capetian monarchs was elective, not hereditary.  There was no mechanism for automatic succession unless an heir was crowned as associate king, ready to step up as primary king when the previous king died. This procedure was very similar to the method by which the Germans elected a King of the Romans during the lifetime of the German monarch.  The early Capetians generally made sure their sons were crowned as associate kings with them, with such success that the inheritance of the eldest son and heir to the kingship came to be accepted as a matter of right.  Louis VI of France was the first king to take the throne without having been crowned in his father's time; however, his right to take the throne was initially contested.

Capetian heirs by Salic succession I
After the accession of Philip II of France, the throne became de jure as well as de facto hereditary, so that on the death of the king, the legal heir became king immediately, and could exercise authority without coronation.  The throne passed to the closest male heir.

Heirs who actually succeeded are shown in bold type. From 1350 on, the heir apparent to the French throne was styled Dauphin.  Heirs so styled are accompanied on the table below by an image of the Dauphin's coat of arms. The title was abandoned in 1791 in favor of the style Prince Royal, less than a year before the abolition of the monarchy.

Lancastrian succession
On May 21, 1420, the government of Charles VI was obliged to sign the Treaty of Troyes, which provided a legal framework for the transfer of power to Henry V, King of England, who had invaded and occupied northern France, including Paris.  Under the treaty, Henry, who was to marry Charles' daughter Catherine, was named as "Heir of France" and the Dauphin Charles was disinherited.  The treaty was not recognized by those factions which were still at war with England, and only had legal force in English-occupied territory and, more briefly, in the Burgundian lands (1420–1435) and in Brittany.

Capetian heirs by Salic succession II
In southern France, the treaty of Troyes was never regarded as valid, and Charles VII was considered to have become king upon his father's death.  Given his repudiation by his father, however, his status remained uncertain until his coronation at Reims on 17 July 1429.  In the following two decades Charles VII regained control of most of France; the English were finally expelled from Guienne on 19 October 1453, retaining only the port of Calais.

Following the abolition of the monarchy of France by the French National Convention, Louis XVI and his family were held in confinement.  Louis XVI was found guilty by the Convention of treason against the state, and was executed on 21 January 1793.  The Dauphin Louis–Charles was thereafter proclaimed "Louis XVII of France" by French royalists, but was kept confined and never reigned. He died of illness on 8 June 1795.

Louis–Stanislas–Xavier, Count of Provence, was subsequently proclaimed "Louis XVIII", but was in exile from France and powerless.

Bonaparte succession: First Empire 
France passed through a series of republican regimes until a hereditary monarchy was restored in the person of Napoleon Bonaparte, who was proclaimed hereditary Emperor of the French on 18 May 1804.  The succession law promulgated at the same time also demanded a Salic succession, in which Napoleon was to be succeeded by, first, his own legitimate offspring, then his elder brother Joseph Bonaparte and his descendants, and finally his younger brother Louis Bonaparte and his descendants. (Napoleon's other brothers were omitted for various reasons.)  The title of the heir apparent of the First Empire was King of Rome.

Napoleon I was defeated by an alliance of most of the other European powers, and abdicated unconditionally, for himself and his son, on 6 April 1814 (an abdication given legal force by a treaty with the Allies dated 11 April 1814) and went into exile.

Restored Bourbon succession I 
On 6 April 1814, the Senate of the French Empire summoned Louis Stanislas Xavier, Count of Provence—already styling himself "Louis XVIII"—to become head of a restored, but constitutional, French monarchy.  Louis' younger brother, Charles, Count of Artois, came to Paris on 12 April and was appointed Lieutenant-General of the realm; Louis himself returned on 3 May, and on 4 June he authorized the publication of a constitution for France (the Charter of 1814) by which he became a constitutional monarch.  With the acceptance of this constitution we can say that the monarchy was resumed, although by royalist principles the Republican and Imperial governments of 1792–1814 had all been illegitimate, and the monarchy itself had never ceased.

On 1 March 1815, however, Napoleon returned to France. With Napoleon I within miles of the capital, Louis XVIII and all his family fled Paris on 19 March, and for the next several months they remained in exile, until the victory of Waterloo allowed them to return.

Restored Bonaparte succession 
On 20 March Napoleon entered Paris and once again proclaimed the Empire.  Although the Imperial Constitution was amended in a more democratic direction, the hereditary office of Emperor and the succession laws remained unchanged.

This restored First Empire lasted until 22 June 1815, when Napoleon abdicated again, this time in favor of a regency on behalf of his son (who had been separated from his father in 1814 and was living in Vienna, Austria).  The nominal reign of Napoleon II lasted no longer than until 7 July 1815, when an Allied army occupied Paris. Napoleon I was now exiled to the Atlantic island of St. Helena, where he died a prisoner 5 May 1821.  Napoleon II continued to live under close observation in Vienna until he died of tuberculosis 22 July 1832.  Neither Joseph nor Louis Bonaparte ever made any effort on behalf of the imperial claims that had descended to them.

Restored Bourbon succession II 
On July 8 Louis XVIII returned to Paris.  Government was resumed under the 1814 Constitution as before.

Charles X's attempt in July 1830 to suspend the Charter of 1814 prompted a revolution.  After several days of violence at the end of July and the beginning of August, Charles and his son fled Paris and signed an instrument of abdication.  The intended beneficiary of the abdication was Charles' grandson (the Dauphin's nephew) Henry, Duke of Bordeaux, a child of 9.

Orléans succession 
After several days of discussion, the French Chamber of Deputies chose to ignore the instrument and instead proclaimed Louis-Philippe, Duke of Orléans, as King on 9 August 1830.

Under the Orléans régime, the style Dauphin was not used for the heir apparent to the French throne; he was called instead Prince Royal, in accordance with the 1791–1792 usage.

After a further revolutionary upheaval in 1848, Louis-Philippe abdicated on 24 February in favor of his grandson Philippe.  The choice of Philippe was not accepted by the Chamber of Deputies, and instead the monarchy was abolished and a new Republic declared.

Bonaparte succession: Second Empire 

The Second Republic elected as its president Louis-Napoléon Bonaparte, son of Napoleon I's brother Louis Bonaparte.  President Bonaparte overthrew the Republic by self coup on 2 December 1851; exactly one year later, following a plebiscite, he converted himself into an Emperor, Napoleon III—considering the brief reign of "Napoleon II" in 1815 as valid.

The succession laws were similar to those of the First Empire, except that Jérôme Bonaparte and his male-line male descendants were, by special decree, eligible for the succession, following the descendants of Napoleon III himself (Joseph Bonaparte had died leaving no male children; other than Napoleon III, no other descendants of Louis Bonaparte survived by 1852).

The heir apparent of the Emperor was titled Prince Imperial, parallel to the Orléans title of Prince Royal.

With the failure of the Imperial army at the Battle of Sedan in the Franco-Prussian War, Napoleon III was captured and his government collapsed.  Two days after the battle a Third Republic was declared which would last for seventy years.  The Imperial family went into exile. France has not been ruled by a monarchy from this point.

Notes

French throne
 
Heirs to the french throne